Highway 790 is a provincial highway in the Canadian province of Saskatchewan. It runs from Highway 6 to Old Highway 35 (Range Road 150). Highway 790 is about 28 km (17 mi.) long.

Highway 790 passes through the unincorporated community of Cherry Ridge.

See also 
Roads in Saskatchewan
Transportation in Saskatchewan

References 

790